Jisr Diyala (Arabic: جسر ديالى)is a southeastern neighborhood of Karrada District, Baghdad, Iraq.

References 

Jesr Diyala